Microcosmus is a genus of tunicates in the family Pyuridae, containing the following species:

Microcosmus albidus Michaelsen, 1904
Microcosmus anchylodeirus Traustedt, 1883
Microcosmus anomalocarpus Millar, 1988
Microcosmus arenaceus Sluiter, 1904
Microcosmus australis Herdman, 1898
Microcosmus bitunicatus Monniot & Monniot, 2001
Microcosmus claudicans (Savigny, 1816)
Microcosmus curvus Tokioka, 1954
Microcosmus exasperatus Heller, 1878
Microcosmus glacialis (Sars, 1859)
Microcosmus hartmeyeri Oka, 1906
Microcosmus helleri Herdman, 1881
Microcosmus hernius (Monniot & Monniot, 1973)
Microcosmus hirsutus Sluiter, 1900
Microcosmus longicloa Monniot & Monniot, 1991
Microcosmus madagascariensis Michaelsen, 1918
Microcosmus miniaceus Sluiter, 1900
Microcosmus multiplicatus Tokioka, 1952
Microcosmus multitentaculatus Tokioka, 1953
Microcosmus nudistigma C. Monniot, 1962
Microcosmus oligophyllus Heller, 1878
Microcosmus pacificus Monniot & Monniot, 2001
Microcosmus planus Kott, 1975
Microcosmus polymorphus Heller, 1877
Microcosmus propinquus Herdman, 1881
Microcosmus psammiferus Monniot, Monniot, Griffiths & Schleyer, 2001
Microcosmus pupa (Savigny, 1816)
Microcosmus sabatieri Roule, 1885
Microcosmus santoensis Monniot & Monniot, 2003
Microcosmus savignyi Monniot, 1962
Microcosmus senegalensis Michaelsen, 1915
Microcosmus squamiger Michaelsen, 1927
Microcosmus stoloniferus Kott, 1952
Microcosmus trigonimus Millar, 1955
Microcosmus tuberculatus Kott, 1985
Microcosmus vesiculosus Monniot & Monniot, 2001
Microcosmus vulgaris Heller, 1877

References

Stolidobranchia
Tunicate genera